The 1985 Big East men's basketball tournament took place at Madison Square Garden in New York City, from March 6 to March 9, 1985. Its winner received the Big East Conference's automatic bid to the 1985 NCAA tournament. It is a single-elimination tournament with four rounds.  St. John's had the best regular season conference record and received the #1 seed.

Georgetown defeated St. John's in the championship game 92–80, to claim its second straight Big East tournament championship, and fourth overall.

Bracket

First round summary

Quarterfinals summary

Semifinals summary

Championship game summary

Awards
Most Valuable Player: Patrick Ewing, Georgetown

All Tournament Team
 Rafael Addison, Syracuse
 Patrick Ewing, Georgetown
 Michael Jackson, Georgetown
 Bill Martin, Georgetown
 Chris Mullin, St. John's
 Ed Pinckney, Villanova

References

External links
 

Tournament
Big East men's basketball tournament
Basketball in New York City
College sports in New York City
Sports competitions in New York City
Sports in Manhattan
Big East men's basketball tournament
Big East men's basketball tournament
1980s in Manhattan
Madison Square Garden